The Vivekananda Vidyaniketan Education Institutions have completed 25 years (Silver Jubilee) of service. The correspondent is Sowgani Komariah and the principal is Janardhan Reddy, with vice-principal Jayapradha Madam.  The school was started in 1987 and consists of five buildings of five floors.

The school has 5,000 students and 500 teachers.

See also 
Education in West Bengal
Swami Vivekananda

References

External links 
 youtube.com, Official Trailer

Educational organisations based in India